Salidroside (rhodioloside) is a glucoside of tyrosol found in the plant Rhodiola rosea. It has been studied, along with rosavin, as one of the potential compounds responsible for the putative antidepressant and anxiolytic actions of this plant. Salidroside may be more active than rosavin, even though many commercially marketed Rhodiola rosea extracts are standardized for rosavin content rather than salidroside.

Bioactivities
Salidroside was shown to improve glucose homeostasis and alleviate diabetic retinopathy in obese mice. The antioxidant, anti-inflammatory and neuroprotective effects of salidroside have also been reported.

Biosynthesis
The salidroside biosynthetic pathway in Rhodiola rosea was described in 2018. Rhodiola contains a pyridoxal phosphate-dependent 4-hydroxyphenylacetaldehyde (4-HPAA) synthase that converts tyrosine to 4-HPAA, which is further reduced to tyrosol by 4-HPAA reductase. Rhodiola contains a regio-selective tyrosol:UDP-glucose 8-O-glucosyltransferase that glycosylates tyrosol to produce salidroside. Using the patented technology resulted from this study, DoubleRainbow Biosciences Inc. announced in July, 2022 that it has successfully produced salidroside at scale using a bioengineered microbial strain.

References 

Phenol glucosides
Phenylethanoids